Gaston Crémieux (born Isaac Louis Gaston, 22 June 1836, Nîmes, France; died 30 November 1871, Marseille) was a lawyer, a journalist and a French writer. He distinguished himself by defending poor people, supporting Gambetta and Garibaldi. He led the League of the South (Ligue du midi) with Esquiros and Bastelica. He was friends with Adolphe Joseph Carcassonne. In 1871, he became head of the Marseille's Commune. This democratic uprising (in conjunction with the Paris Commune) repressed in the blood by General Espivent, Gaston Cremieux was sentenced to death by a military court and died at thirty-five years, mercy having been refused by Thiers and the commission with which he was surrounded. He was celebrated by Victor Hugo, Louise Michel, and Jean Jaurès.

Notes

Sources 
   His posthumous works :  Gaston Cremieux, Paris E. Dentu. 1879, p. 1  here
 Marseille's commune story on line at marxist.org, by  Prosper-Olivier Lissagaray

1836 births
1871 deaths
French activists
People of the Paris Commune
Freemasonry
19th-century French Jews
French poets
Aix-Marseille University alumni
French male poets
19th-century poets
19th-century male writers
People from Nîmes